NAFI may refer to:

Organizations
 National Association of Fire Investigators
 National Association of Flight Instructors (USA)
 North American Forum on Integration (Canada, Mexico, USA

People
 Nafi‘ al-Madani, one of the seven canonical transmitters of Qur'an reading
 Abu Suhail an-Nafi, an Islamic scholar

See also
Navy, Army and Air Force Institutes (NAAFI) (United Kingdom)
Nafi (disambiguation)